is a former Japanese football player.

Club career
Yamanishi was born in Shizuoka on April 2, 1976. After graduating from Shimizu Higashi High School, he joined Júbilo Iwata in 1995. He debuted in 1997 and played many matches as left defender. The club won the champions 1997, 1999, 2002 J1 League, 1998 J.League Cup and 2003 Emperor's Cup. In Asia, the club won the champions 1998–99 Asian Club Championship and the 2nd place 1999–00 and 2000–01 Asian Club Championship. This is golden era in the club history. In 2005, he moved to across Shizuoka Prefecture to the Júbilo Iwata rivals, Shimizu S-Pulse. Although he played most games as left side-back, his opportunity to play decreased behind Arata Kodama from 2007. He retired end of 2008 season.

National team career
In April 1995, Yamanishi was elected Japan U-20 national team for 1995 World Youth Championship. He played 3 matches as left side midfielder.

Club statistics

Honors and awards

Club
Júbilo Iwata
 AFC Champions League: 1998–99
 Asian Super Cup: 1999
 J1 League: 1997, 1999, 2002
 Emperor's Cup: 2003
 J.League Cup: 1998
 Japanese Super Cup: 2000, 2003, 2004

References

External links

1976 births
Living people
Association football people from Shizuoka Prefecture
Japanese footballers
Japan youth international footballers
J1 League players
Júbilo Iwata players
Shimizu S-Pulse players
Association football defenders